Terence Crawford vs. Julius Indongo was a professional boxing match contested for the undisputed light welterweight championship between undefeated WBC, WBO, and The Ring champion Terence Crawford, and undefeated WBA (Unified), and IBF champion Julius Indongo. The bout took place on August 19, 2017, at the Pinnacle Bank Arena in Lincoln, Nebraska. Crawford defeated Indongo via third-round KO.

Background
Following his reign as the WBO lightweight champion in 2014, Crawford moved up to light welterweight in April 2015 to capture the vacant WBO title against Thomas Dulorme. After two defences of his title, he defeated WBC champion Viktor Postol in July 2016 to unify the WBC, and WBO titles, while also capturing the vacant Ring magazine title in the process.

Indongo defeated reigning champion Eduard Troyanovsky in December 2016 to capture the IBF, and IBO light welterweight titles. Four months later he defeated reigning champion Ricky Burns for the WBA (Unified) title in April 2017, capturing the last of the four major world titles in the light welterweight division and setting up the undisputed title fight. Indongo's IBO title was not on the line as the Namibian champion had been stripped of the title for refusing to pay the IBO's sanctioning fees, which already stood at $100,000 for each fighter.

The Fight
The first round was a tentative affair; both fighters attempting to establish their presence in the center of the ring, engaging in a battle of the jabs with neither fighter landing any significant punches. The second round began the same as the previous. Halfway through the round Crawford began increasing his punch output. With a minute left in the round, Crawford caught Indongo with a straight left hand, sending the Namibian champion to the canvas. Indongo raised to his feet before the referee's count of five and survived the rest of the round. The first minute of round three saw both fighters throwing the jab and missing with the occasional left hand from the southpaw stance. 1 minute into the round, Indongo began putting together combinations and walking towards Crawford. At the halfway point, as Indongo rushed in on the offensive, Crawford landed two solid body punches to drop Indongo for a second time. With Indongo laid on his back wincing in pain, referee Jack Reiss reached the count of ten, crowning Crawford as the new undisputed light welterweight champion by a third-round knockout.

Fight card

See also
List of undisputed world boxing champions

Notes

References

2017 in boxing
August 2017 sports events in the United States
2017 in sports in Nebraska
Sports in Lincoln, Nebraska